Sotavento is a Portuguese and Spanish word meaning "leeward". Places with that name include:

Sotavento Algarvio, the eastern part of the Algarve region, Portugal, around Faro and Tavira
Sotavento Islands, the southern group of Cape Verde islands
Sotavento Region of the Mexican state of Veracruz